The Royal Air Force (RAF) is the United Kingdom's aerial warfare and space force. It was formed towards the end of the First World War on 1 April 1918, becoming the first independent air force in the world, by regrouping the Royal Flying Corps (RFC) and the Royal Naval Air Service (RNAS). Following the Allied victory over the Central Powers in 1918, the RAF emerged as the largest air force in the world at the time. Since its formation, the RAF has taken a significant role in British military history. In particular, it played a large part in the Second World War where it fought its most famous campaign, the Battle of Britain.

The RAF's mission is to support the objectives of the British Ministry of Defence (MOD), which are to "provide the capabilities needed to ensure the security and defence of the United Kingdom and overseas territories, including against terrorism; to support the Government's foreign policy objectives particularly in promoting international peace and security". The RAF describes its mission statement as "... [to provide] an agile, adaptable and capable Air Force that, person for person, is second to none, and that makes a decisive air power contribution in support of the UK Defence Mission". The mission statement is supported by the RAF's definition of air power, which guides its strategy. Air power is defined as "the ability to project power from the air and space to influence the behaviour of people or the course of events".

Today, the Royal Air Force maintains an operational fleet of various types of aircraft, described by the RAF as being "leading-edge" in terms of technology. This largely consists of fixed-wing aircraft, including those in the following roles: fighter and strike, airborne early warning and control, intelligence, surveillance, target acquisition, and reconnaissance (ISTAR), signals intelligence (SIGINT), maritime patrol, air-to-air refuelling (AAR) and strategic & tactical transport. The majority of the RAF's rotary-wing aircraft form part of the tri-service Joint Helicopter Command in support of ground forces. Most of the RAF's aircraft and personnel are based in the UK, with many others serving on global operations (principally over Iraq and Syria) or at long-established overseas bases (Ascension Island, Cyprus, Gibraltar, and the Falkland Islands). Although the RAF is the principal British air power arm, the Royal Navy's Fleet Air Arm and the British Army's Army Air Corps also operate armed aircraft.

History

Origins
While the British were not the first to make use of heavier-than-air military aircraft, the RAF is the world's oldest independent air force: that is, the first air force to become independent of army or navy control. The RAF was founded on 1 April 1918 (during World War I) by the amalgamation of the Royal Flying Corps (RFC) and the Royal Naval Air Service (RNAS), as recommended in a report prepared by Jan Smuts. At that time it was the largest air force in the world. Its headquarters was located in the former Hotel Cecil.

After the war, the RAF was drastically cut and its inter-war years were relatively quiet. The RAF was put in charge of British military activity in Iraq, and carried out minor activities in other parts of the British Empire, including establishing bases to protect Singapore and Malaya. The RAF's naval aviation branch, the Fleet Air Arm, was founded in 1924 but handed over to Admiralty control on 24 May 1939.

The RAF adopted the doctrine of strategic bombing, which led to the construction of long-range bombers and became its main bombing strategy in the Second World War.

Second World War
The Royal Air Force underwent rapid expansion prior to and during the Second World War. Under the British Commonwealth Air Training Plan of December 1939, the air forces of British Commonwealth countries trained and formed "Article XV squadrons" for service with RAF formations. Many individual personnel from these countries, and exiles from occupied Europe, also served with RAF squadrons. By the end of the war the Royal Canadian Air Force had contributed more than 30 squadrons to serve in RAF formations, similarly, approximately a quarter of Bomber Command's personnel were Canadian. Additionally, the Royal Australian Air Force represented around nine percent of all RAF personnel who served in the European and Mediterranean theatres.
During the Battle of Britain in 1940, the RAF defended the skies over Britain against the numerically superior German . In what is perhaps the most prolonged and complicated air campaign in history, the Battle of Britain contributed significantly to the delay and subsequent indefinite postponement of Operation Sea Lion, Hitler's plans for an invasion of the UK. In the House of Commons on 20 August, prompted by the ongoing efforts of the RAF, Prime Minister Winston Churchill made a speech to the nation, where he said "Never in the field of human conflict was so much owed by so many to so few".The largest RAF effort during the war was the strategic bombing campaign against Germany by Bomber Command. While RAF bombing of Germany began almost immediately upon the outbreak of war at first it was ineffectual; it was only later, particularly under the leadership of Air Chief Marshal Harris, that these attacks became increasingly devastating, from early 1943 onward, as new technology and greater numbers of superior aircraft became available. The RAF adopted night-time area bombing on German cities such as Hamburg and Dresden. Night time area bombing constituted the great bulk of the RAF's bombing campaign, mainly due to Harris, but it also developed precision bombing techniques for specific operations, such as the "Dambusters" raid by No. 617 Squadron, or the Amiens prison raid known as Operation Jericho.

Cold War era
 
Following victory in the Second World War, the RAF underwent significant re-organisation, as technological advances in air warfare saw the arrival of jet fighters and bombers. During the early stages of the Cold War, one of the first major operations undertaken by the RAF was the Berlin Airlift, codenamed Operation Plainfire. Between 26 June 1948 and the lifting of the Russian blockade of the city on 12 May 1949, the RAF provided 17% of the total supplies delivered, using Avro Yorks, Douglas Dakotas flying to Gatow Airport and Short Sunderlands flying to Lake Havel.

Before Britain developed its own nuclear weapons, the RAF was provided with American nuclear weapons under Project E. However, following the development of its own arsenal, the British Government elected on 16 February 1960 to share the country's nuclear deterrent between the RAF and submarines of the Royal Navy, first deciding to concentrate solely on the air force's V bomber fleet. These were initially armed with nuclear gravity bombs, later being equipped with the Blue Steel missile. Following the development of the Royal Navy's Polaris submarines, the strategic nuclear deterrent passed to the navy's submarines on 30 June 1969. With the introduction of Polaris, the RAF's strategic nuclear role was reduced to a tactical one, using WE.177 gravity bombs. This tactical role was continued by the V bombers into the 1980s and until 1998 by the Panavia Tornado GR1.

For much of the Cold War the primary role of the RAF was the defence of Western Europe against potential attack by the Soviet Union, with many squadrons based in West Germany. The main RAF bases in RAF(G) were RAF Brüggen, RAF Gutersloh, RAF Laarbruch and RAF Wildenrath – the only air defence base in RAF(G). With the decline of the British Empire, global operations were scaled back, and RAF Far East Air Force was disbanded on 31 October 1971. Despite this, the RAF fought in many battles in the Cold War period. In June 1948 the RAF commenced Operation Firedog against Malayan pro-independence fighters during the Malayan Emergency. Operations continued for the next 12 years until 1960 with aircraft flying out of RAF Tengah and RAF Butterworth. The RAF played a minor role in the Korean War, with flying boats taking part. From 1953 to 1956 the RAF Avro Lincoln squadrons carried out anti-Mau Mau operations in Kenya using its base at RAF Eastleigh. The Suez Crisis in 1956 saw a large RAF role, with aircraft operating from RAF Akrotiri and RAF Nicosia on Cyprus and RAF Luqa and RAF Hal Far on Malta as part of Operation Musketeer. The RAF suffered its most recent loss to an enemy aircraft during the Suez Crisis, when an English Electric Canberra PR7 was shot down over Syria.  In 1957, the RAF participated heavily during the Jebel Akhdar War in Oman, operating both de Havilland Venom and Avro Shackleton aircraft. The RAF made 1,635 raids, dropping 1,094 tons and firing 900 rockets at the interior of Oman between July and December 1958, targeting insurgents, mountain top villages and water channels in a war that remained under low profile. The Konfrontasi against Indonesia in the early 1960s did see use of RAF aircraft, but due to a combination of deft diplomacy and selective ignoring of certain events by both sides, it never developed into a full-scale war.

One of the largest actions undertaken by the RAF during the Cold War was the air campaign during the 1982 Falklands War, in which the RAF operated alongside the Fleet Air Arm. During the war, RAF aircraft were deployed in the mid-Atlantic at RAF Ascension Island and a detachment from No. 1 Squadron was deployed with the Royal Navy, operating from the aircraft carrier HMS Hermes. RAF pilots also flew missions using the Royal Navy's Sea Harriers in the air-to-air combat role, in particular Flight Lieutenant Dave Morgan the highest scoring pilot of the war. Following a British victory, the RAF remained in the South Atlantic to provide air defence to the Falkland Islands, with the McDonnell Douglas Phantom FGR2 based at RAF Mount Pleasant which was built in 1984.

Post-Cold War

With the end of the Cold War and the collapse of the Soviet Union, the RAF's focus returned to expeditionary air power. Since 1990, the RAF has been involved in several large-scale operations, including the 1991 Gulf War, the 1999 Kosovo War, the 2001 War in Afghanistan, the 2003 invasion and war in Iraq and the 2011 intervention in Libya.

The RAF's 90th anniversary was commemorated on 1 April 2008 by a flypast of the RAF's Aerobatic Display Team the Red Arrows and four Eurofighter Typhoons along the River Thames, in a straight line from just south of London City Airport Tower Bridge, the London Eye, the RAF Memorial and (at 13.00) the Ministry of Defence building.

Four major defence reviews have been conducted since the end of the Cold War: the 1990 Options for Change, the 1998 Strategic Defence Review, the 2003 Delivering Security in a Changing World and the 2010 Strategic Defence and Security Review (SDSR). All four defence reviews have resulted in steady reductions in manpower and numbers of aircraft, especially combat aircraft such as fast-jets. As part of the latest 2010 Strategic Defence and Security Review, the BAE Systems Nimrod MRA4 maritime patrol aircraft was cancelled due to over spending and missing deadlines. Other reductions saw total manpower reduced by 5,000 personnel to a trained strength of 33,000 and the early retirement of the Joint Force Harrier aircraft, the BAE Harrier GR7/GR9.

In recent years, fighter aircraft on Quick Reaction Alert (QRA) have been increasingly required to scramble in response to Russian Air Force aircraft approaching British airspace. On 24 January 2014, in the Houses of Parliament, Conservative MP and Minister of State for the Armed Forces, Andrew Robathan, announced that the RAF's QRA force had been scrambled almost thirty times in the last three years: eleven times during 2010, ten times during 2011 and eight times during 2012.RAF Coningsby in Lincolnshire and RAF Lossiemouth in Moray both provide QRA aircraft, and scramble their Typhoons within minutes to meet or intercept aircraft which give cause for concern. Lossiemouth generally covers the northern sector of UK airspace, while Coningsby covers the southern sector. Typhoon pilot Flight Lieutenant Noel Rees describes how QRA duty works. "At the start of the scaled QRA response, civilian air traffic controllers might see on their screens an aircraft behaving erratically, not responding to their radio calls, or note that it's transmitting a distress signal through its transponder. Rather than scramble Typhoons at the first hint of something abnormal, a controller has the option to put them on a higher level of alert, 'a call to cockpit'. In this scenario the pilot races to the hardened aircraft shelter and does everything short of starting his engines".

On 4 October 2015, a final stand-down saw the end of more than 70 years of RAF Search and Rescue provision in the UK. The RAF and Royal Navy's Westland Sea King fleets, after over 30 years of service, were retired. A civilian contractor, Bristow Helicopters, took over responsibility for UK Search and Rescue, under a Private Finance Initiative with newly purchased Sikorsky S-92 and AgustaWestland AW189 aircraft. The new contract means that all UK SAR coverage is now provided by Bristow aircraft.

In 2018, the RAF's vision of a future constellation of imagery satellites was initiated through the launch of the Carbonite-2 technology demonstrator. The 100 kg Carbonite-2 uses commercial off-the-shelf (COTS) components to deliver high-quality imagery and 3D video footage from space.

From March 2020, as part of Operation Rescript, the RAF has been assisting with the response efforts to the COVID-19 pandemic in the United Kingdom. This has seen the service provide repatriation flights and aeromedical evacuations of COVID-19 patients, drivers and call-handlers to support ambulance services and medics to assist with the staffing of hospitals, testing units and vaccination centres. Under Operation Broadshare, the RAF has also been involved with COVID-19 relief operations overseas, repatriating stranded nationals and delivering medical supplies and vaccines to British Overseas Territories and military installations.

Structure

Senior management 

The professional head and highest-ranking officer of the Royal Air Force is the Chief of the Air Staff (CAS). He reports to the Chief of the Defence Staff, who is the professional head of the British Armed Forces. The incumbent Chief of the Air Staff is Air Chief Marshal Sir Mike Wigston, who was appointed in July 2019.

The management of the RAF is the responsibility of the Air Force Board, a sub-committee of the Defence Council which is part of the Ministry of Defence and body legally responsible for the defence of the United Kingdom and its overseas territories. The Chief of the Air Staff chairs the Air Force Board Standing Committee (AFBSC) which decides on the policy and actions required for the RAF to meet the requirements of the Defence Council and His Majesty's Government.

The Chief of the Air Staff is supported by several other senior commanders; the main positions are shown in the following table.

Air Command 
Administrative and operational command of the RAF is delegated by the Air Force Board to Headquarters Air Command, based at RAF High Wycombe in Buckinghamshire. Air Command was formed on 1 April 2007 by combining RAF Strike Command and RAF Personnel and Training Command, resulting in a single command covering the whole RAF, led by the Chief of the Air Staff. Through its subordinate groups, Air Command oversees the whole spectrum of RAF aircraft and operations.

United Kingdom Space Command (UKSC), established 1 April 2021 under the command of Air Vice-Marshal Paul Godfrey is a joint command, but sits "under the Royal Air Force." Godfrey is of equal rank to the commanders of 1, 2, 11, and 22 Groups. The new command has "responsibility for not just operations, but also generating, training and growing the force, and also owning the money and putting all the programmatic rigour into delivering new ..capabilities." UKSC headquarters is at RAF High Wycombe co-located with Air Command.

Groups
Groups are the subdivisions of operational commands and are responsible for certain types of capabilities or for operations in limited geographical areas. There are five groups subordinate to Air Command, of which four are functional and one is geographically focused:

No. 1 Group (Air Combat) 
No. 1 Group is responsible for combat aircraft (comprising the Lightning Force and Typhoon Force) and the RAF's intelligence, surveillance, target acquisition, and reconnaissance (ISTAR) capabilities. It oversees stations at RAF Coningsby and RAF Waddington in Lincolnshire, RAF Lossiemouth in Moray and RAF Marham in Norfolk. The group's Eurofighter Typhoon FGR4 aircraft protect UK and NATO airspace by providing a continuous Quick Reaction Alert capability.

No. 2 Group (Air Combat Support) 
No. 2 Group controls the Air Mobility Force which provides strategic and tactical airlift, air-to-air refuelling and Command Support Air Transport. The group is also responsible for the RAF's Force Protection assets comprising the RAF Regiment and RAF Police. It oversees stations at RAF Benson and RAF Brize Norton in Oxfordshire, RAF Henlow in Bedfordshire, RAF Honington in Suffolk, RAF Odiham in Hampshire and RAF Northolt in West London.

No. 11 Group (Multi-domain operations)
No. 11 Group is responsible for integrating operations across the air, cyber and space domains whilst responding to new and evolving threats. It includes the RAF's Battlespace Management Force which controls the UK Air Surveillance and Control System (ASACS). The group oversees stations at RAF Boulmer in Northumberland, RAF Fylingdales in North Yorkshire, RAF Scampton in Lincolnshire and RAF Spadeadam in Cumbria.

No. 22 Group (Training)
No. 22 Group is responsible for the supply of qualified and skilled personnel to the RAF and provides flying and non-flying training to all three British armed services. It is the end-user of the UK Military Flying Training System which is provided by civilian contractor Ascent Flight Training. The group oversees stations at RAF College Cranwell in Lincolnshire, RAF Cosford and RAF Shawbury in Shropshire, RAF Halton in Buckinghamshire, MOD St Athan in the Vale of Glamorgan, RAF St Mawgan in Cornwall and RAF Valley on Angelsey. The No. 22 Group also manages the Royal Air Force Air Cadets.

No. 83 Expeditionary Air Group
No. 83 Expeditionary Air Group (No. 83 EAG) is the RAF's operational headquarters in the Middle East, based at Al Udeid Air Base in Qatar. It is responsible for UK air operations in the Persian Gulf and Indian Ocean (Operation Kipion), the military intervention against the Islamic State of Iraq and the Levant (Operation Shader) and wider UK defence objectives in the Middle East. Operations are delivered through four Expeditionary Air Wings (No. 901 EAW, No. 902 EAW, No. 903 EAW and No. 904 EAW).

Stations

An RAF station is ordinarily subordinate to a group and is commanded by a group captain. Each station typically hosts several flying and non-flying squadrons or units which are supported by administrative and support wings.

United Kingdom 
Front-line flying operations are focussed at eight stations:

 RAF Coningsby, RAF Marham and RAF Lossiemouth (Air Combat)
 RAF Waddington (Intelligence, Surveillance Target Acquisition and Reconnaissance (ISTAR))
 RAF Brize Norton and RAF Northolt (Air Transport)
 RAF Benson and RAF Odiham (Support Helicopter Force operating under Joint Helicopter Command)

Flying training takes places at RAF Barkston Heath, RAF College Cranwell, RAF Shawbury and RAF Valley, each forming part of the UK Military Flying Training System which is dedicated to training aircrew for all three UK armed services. Specialist ground crew training is focused at RAF Cosford, RAF St Mawgan and MOD St. Athan.

Operations are supported by numerous other flying and non-flying stations, with activity focussed at RAF Honington which coordinates Force Protection and RAF Leeming & RAF Wittering which have a support enabler role.

A Control and Reporting Centre (CRC) at RAF Boulmer is tasked with compiling a Recognised Air Picture of UK air space and providing tactical control of the Quick Reaction Alert Force. In order to achieve this Boulmer is supported by a network of eight Remote Radar Heads (RRHs) spread the length of the UK.

Overseas 
The UK operates permanent military airfields (known as Permanent Joint Operating Bases) in four British Overseas Territories. These bases contribute to the physical defence and maintenance of sovereignty of the British Overseas Territories and enable the UK to conduct expeditionary military operations. Although command and oversight of the bases is provided by Strategic Command, the airfield elements are known as RAF stations.

 RAF Akrotiri (Sovereign Base Areas of Akrotiri and Dhekelia, Cyprus)
 RAF Ascension Island (Saint Helena, Ascension and Tristan da Cuhna)
 RAF Mount Pleasant (Falkland Islands)
 RAF Gibraltar (Gibraltar)

Three RAF squadrons are based overseas. No. 84 Squadron is located at RAF Akrotiri, operating the Griffin HAR.2 for search and rescue. No. 17 Test and Evaluation Squadron and No. 39 Squadron are located within the United States to support close cooperation with the U.S. Air Force in the development of the F-35B Lightning (Edwards Air Force Base, California) and the operation of the MQ-9A Reaper (Creech Air Force Base, Nevada) respectively.

Squadrons
A flying squadron is an aircraft unit which carries out the primary tasks of the RAF. RAF squadrons are somewhat analogous to the regiments of the British Army in that they have histories and traditions going back to their formation, regardless of where they are based or which aircraft they are operating. They can be awarded standards and battle honours for meritorious service. Most flying squadrons are commanded by a wing commander and, for a fast-jet squadron, have an establishment of around twelve aircraft.

Flights 

Independent flights are so designated because they are explicitly smaller in size than a squadron. Many independent flights are, or have been, front-line flying units. For example, No. 1435 Flight carries out air defence duties for the Falkland Islands, with four Eurofighter Typhoon fighters based at RAF Mount Pleasant.

Support wings and units 

Support capabilities are provided by several specialist wings and other units.

 Air Warfare Centre (RAF Waddington)
 Airborne Delivery Wing (RAF Brize Norton)
 Mobile Meteorological Unit (RAF Scampton)
 Tactical Communications Wing (RAF Leeming)
 Tactical Medical Wing (RAF Brize Norton)
 Tactical Supply Wing (MOD Stafford)

 No. 1 Air Control Centre (RAF Scampton)
 No. 1 Air Mobility Wing (RAF Brize Norton)
 No. 1 Intelligence, Surveillance and Reconnaissance Wing (RAF Waddington)
 No. 42 (Expeditionary Support) Wing (RAF Wittering)
 No. 85 (Expeditionary Logistics) Wing (RAF Wittering)
 No. 90 Signals Unit (RAF Leeming)

Expeditionary Air Wings 

Command, control, and support for overseas operations is typically provided through Expeditionary Air Wings (EAWs). Each wing is brought together as and when required and comprises the deployable elements of its home station as well as other support elements from throughout the RAF.

 No. 34 Expeditionary Air Wing (RAF Waddington) – ISTAR operations
 No. 38 Expeditionary Air Wing (RAF Brize Norton) – air transport operations
 No. 121 Expeditionary Air Wing (RAF Coningsby) – multi-role operations
 No. 135 Expeditionary Air Wing (RAF Leeming) – fighter operations
 No. 138 Expeditionary Air Wing (RAF Marham) – fighter operations
 No. 140 Expeditionary Air Wing (RAF Lossiemouth) – fighter operations

Several Expeditionary Air Wings are based overseas:

 No. 901 Expeditionary Air Wing (Al Udeid Air Base, Qatar) – Communication and information systems support
 No. 902 Expeditionary Air Wing (Middle East) – Helicopter support
No. 903 Expeditionary Air Wing (RAF Akrotiri, Cyprus) – Supports Operation Shader
No. 905 Expeditionary Air Wing (RAF Mount Pleasant, Falklands Islands) – Protection of  British Overseas Territories in the South Atlantic
 No. 906 Expeditionary Air Wing (Middle East) – Air transport support

Training schools

Flying training 
The RAF Schools consist of the squadrons and support apparatus that train new aircrew to join front-line squadrons. The schools separate individual streams, but group together units with similar responsibility or that operate the same aircraft type. Some schools operate with only one squadron, and have an overall training throughput which is relatively small; some, like No. 3 Flying Training School, have responsibility for all Elementary Flying Training (EFT) in the RAF, and all RAF aircrew will pass through its squadrons when they start their flying careers. No. 2 Flying Training School and No. 6 Flying Training School do not have a front-line training responsibility – their job is to group the University Air Squadrons and the Volunteer Gliding Squadrons together. The commanding officer of No. 2 FTS holds the only full-time flying appointment for a Group Captain in the RAF, and is a reservist.

Central Flying School (RAF Cranwell) – standardises flying training across the air force and ensures standards and safety are maintained.
No. 1 Flying Training School (RAF Shawbury) – basic and advanced helicopter training.
No. 2 Flying Training School (RAF Syerston) – gliding training provided by Volunteer Gliding Squadrons based at airfields throughout the UK.
No. 3 Flying Training School (RAF Cranwell) – Elementary Flying Training (EFT) for RAF, Fleet Air Arm and Army Air Corps crews, also operates from RAF Wittering and RAF Barkston Heath.
No. 4 Flying Training School (RAF Valley) – Basic Fast Jet Training (BFJT) and Advanced Fast Jet Training (AFJT).
No. 6 Flying Training School (RAF Cranwell) – Initial training provided by University Air Squadrons and Air Experience Flights based at airfields throughout the UK.

Non-flying training 

The British military operate a number of joint training organisations, with Air Command leading the provision of technical training through the Defence College of Technical Training (DCTT). It provides training in aeronautical engineering, electro and mechanical engineering, and communication and information systems.

 No. 1 School of Technical Training is based at RAF Cosford and provides RAF personnel with mechanical, avionics, weapons and survival equipment training. Also based at Cosford is the Aerosystems Engineer and Management Training School. Both are part of the Defence School of Aeronautical Engineering. 
 No. 4 School of Technical Training is part of the Defence School of Electronic and Mechanical Engineering (DSEME) and is based at MOD St Athan. It provides training to non-aircraft ground engineering technicians.
 No. 1 Radio School and the Aerial Erectors School are based at Cosford and RAF Digby respectively and are part of the Defence School of Communications and Information Systems.

Specialist training and education
The Royal Air Force operates several units and centres for the provision of non-generic training and education. These include the Royal Air Force Leadership Centre and the RAF Centre for Air Power Studies, both based at RAF Cranwell, and the Air Warfare Centre, based at RAF Waddington and RAF Cranwell. Non-commissioned officer training and developmental courses occur at RAF Halton and officer courses occur at the Joint Services Command and Staff College at Shrivenham.

Personnel

At its height in 1944 during the Second World War, more than 1,100,000 personnel were serving in the RAF. The longest-lived founding member of the RAF was Henry Allingham, who died on 18 July 2009 aged 113.

As of 1 January 2015, the RAF numbered some 34,200 Regular and 1,940 Royal Auxiliary Air Force personnel, giving a combined component strength of 36,140 personnel. In addition to the active elements of the RAF, (Regular and Royal Auxiliary Air Force), all ex-Regular personnel remain liable to be recalled for duty in a time of need, this is known as the Regular Reserve. In 2007, there were 33,980 RAF Regular Reserves, of which 7,950 served under a fixed-term reserve contract. Publications since April 2013 no-longer report the entire strength of the Regular Reserve, instead they only give a figure for Regular Reserves who serve under a fixed-term reserve contract. They had a strength of 7,120 personnel in 2014.

Figures provided by the International Institute for Strategic Studies from 2012 showed that RAF pilots achieve a relatively high number of flying hours per year when compared with other major NATO allies such as France and Germany. RAF pilots achieve 210 to 290 flying hours per year. French and German Air Force pilots achieved 180 and 150 flying hours across their fleets respectively.

Officers

Officers hold a commission from the Sovereign, which provides the legal authority for them to issue orders to subordinates. The commission of a regular officer is granted after successfully completing the 24-week-long Initial Officer Training course at the RAF College, Cranwell, Lincolnshire.

To emphasise the merger of both military and naval aviation when the RAF was formed, many of the titles of officers were deliberately chosen to be of a naval character, such as flight lieutenant, wing commander, group captain, and air commodore.

Other ranks
Other ranks attend the Recruit Training Squadron at RAF Halton for basic training. The titles and insignia of other ranks in the RAF were based on that of the Army, with some alterations in terminology. Over the years, this structure has seen significant changes: for example, there was once a separate system for those in technical trades, and the ranks of chief technician and junior technician continue to be held only by personnel in technical trades. RAF other ranks fall into four categories: Warrant Officers, Senior Non-Commissioned Officers, Junior Non-Commissioned Officers and Airmen. All Warrant Officers in the RAF are equal in terms of rank, but the most senior Non-Commissioned appointment is known as the  Warrant Officer of the Royal Air Force.

Ranks

Aircraft

Combat air

Typhoon

The Eurofighter Typhoon FGR4 is the RAF's primary multi-role air defence and ground attack fighter aircraft, following the retirement of the Panavia Tornado F3 in late March 2011.  With the completion of 'Project Centurion' upgrades, the Typhoon FGR4 took over ground attack duties from the Panavia Tornado GR4, which was retired on 1 April 2019.  The Typhoon is tasked to defend UK airspace, while also frequently deploying in support of NATO air defence missions in the Baltic (Operation Azotize), Black Sea (Operation Biloxi), and Iceland.

The RAF has seven front-line Typhoon squadrons, plus an Operational Conversion Unit (OCU), and Operational Evaluation Unit (OEU); No. 3 (Fighter) Squadron, No. XI (Fighter) Squadron, No. 12 Squadron (joint RAF / Qatar Air Force), No. 29 Squadron (OCU), and No. 41 Test and Evaluation Squadron (OEU) based at RAF Coningsby; with No. 1 (F) Squadron, No. II (Army Cooperation) Squadron, No. 6 Squadron, and No. IX (Bomber) Squadron based at RAF Lossiemouth.  Additionally, four Typhoons (Faith, Hope, Charity, and Desperation) are based at RAF Mount Pleasant on the Falkland Islands, forming No. 1435 Flight, where they provide air defence.  It was originally suggested that an eighth front-line Typhoon squadron could be formed, however, the 2021 Defence Command Paper announced the retirement of 24 Tranche 1 Typhoons by 2025, and a commitment to seven front-line squadrons.

The Typhoon made its combat debut in support of Operation Ellamy in 2011, and has been supporting Operation Shader since December 2015.

Lightning
The F-35B Lightning is a single-seat, single-engine, all-weather stealth multirole combat aircraft. It is intended to perform both air superiority and strike missions while also providing electronic warfare and intelligence, surveillance, and reconnaissance capabilities. It will be jointly operated by the RAF and the Royal Navy and with its ability to perform short take-offs and vertical-landings (STOVL), can operate from the Royal Navy's Queen Elizabeth-class aircraft carriers. Originally a total of 138 Lightnings were planned, however the 2021 Defence Command Paper amended this to a commitment to increase the fleet beyond the current order of 48. By November 2022, 30 F-35Bs had been delivered to the RAF (though one crashed in November 2021). The F-35B has an out of service date (OSD) of 2069.

The first RAF squadron to operate the F-35B was No. 17 Test and Evaluation Squadron at Edwards AFB, California, accepting its first aircraft in 2014. No. 617 (The Dambusters) Squadron officially reformed on 18 April 2018 as the first operational RAF Lightning squadron. The first four aircraft arrived at RAF Marham from the United States in June 2018, with a further five arriving in August 2018. The Lightning was declared combat ready in January 2019. The second UK based F-35B squadron to be formed was No. 207 Squadron on 1 August 2019 as the OCU for both RAF and Royal Navy pilots.

Intelligence, surveillance, target acquisition, and reconnaissance (ISTAR) 
Six Hawker Beechcraft Shadow R1s (with two more to be converted) are operated by No. 14 Squadron from RAF Waddington, these aircraft are King Air 350CERs that have been specially converted for the ISTAR role. Four Shadow R1s were originally ordered in 2007 due to an Urgent Operational Requirement, and began the conversion process to the ISTAR role in 2009. ZZ416 was the first Shadow R1 to be delivered in May 2009 to No. V (AC) Squadron. A further Shadow was procured and delivered in December 2011. The Shadow fleet was transferred over to the newly reformed No. 14 Squadron in October 2011. Following the 2015 SDSR, three more Shadows were ordered and the fleet was given an OSD of 2030.

Ten General Atomics MQ-9A Reaper unmanned aerial vehicles have been purchased to support operations in Iraq and Afghanistan. They are operated by No. 39 Squadron based at Creech Air Force Base and No. XIII Squadron at RAF Waddington.

Three Boeing RC-135W Rivet Joints (also known in RAF service as Airseeker) replaced the Hawker Siddeley Nimrod R1 fleet in the signals intelligence role under the Airseeker Programme and are flown by No. 51 Squadron. The Nimrod fleet was retired in 2011, the RAF co-manned aircraft of the US Air Force until the three RC-135s entered service between 2014 and 2017. The aircraft were Boeing KC-135R Stratotanker tankers converted to RC-135W standard in the most complex combined Foreign Military Sales case and co-operative support arrangement that the UK had undertaken with the United States Air Force since the Second World War. The Rivet Joint received its first operational deployment in August 2014, when it was deployed to the Middle East to fly missions over Iraq and Syria as part of Operation Shader. The RC-135W's OSD is 2035.

Based at RAF Waddington, No. 54 Squadron and No. 56 Squadron act as the OCU and OEU for the ISTAR fleet respectively.

Maritime patrol

Nine Boeing Poseidon MRA1 were ordered by the Government in November 2015 in its Strategic Defence and Security Review for surveillance, anti-submarine and anti-surface ship warfare, filling a capability gap in maritime patrol that had been left since the cancellation of the BAE Systems Nimrod MRA4 programme in the 2010 SDSR. On 13 July 2017, it was announced that No. 120 Squadron and No. 201 Squadron, both former Nimrod MR2 squadrons, would operate the Poseidon and be based at RAF Lossiemouth. No. 120 Squadron stood up on 1 April 2018, with No. 201 Squadron reforming on 7 August 2021. No. 54 Squadron acts as the OCU for the Poseidon fleet.

The first production Poseidon MRA1 ZP801 made its initial flight on 13 July 2019. ZP801 arrived at Kinloss Barracks, the former home of the Nimrod, on 4 February 2020, filling a decade long gap in maritime capability. The Poseidon was declared combat ready in April 2020. The Poseidon carried out its first operational mission on 3 August 2020, when the Russian warship Vasily Bykov was tracked. A Poseidon MRA1 arrived at RAF Lossiemouth for the first time in October 2020. The ninth, and final Poseidon arrived at RAF Lossiemouth on 11 January 2022.

Air mobility

No. 99 Squadron operate eight Boeing C-17A Globemaster III in the heavy strategic airlift role from RAF Brize Norton, Oxfordshire. Four C-17A were originally leased from Boeing in 2000, These four were subsequently purchased outright, followed by a fifth delivered on 7 April 2008 and a sixth delivered on 11 June 2008. The MOD said there was "a stated departmental requirement for eight" C-17s and a seventh was subsequently ordered, to be delivered in December 2010. In February 2012 the purchase of an eighth C-17 was confirmed; the aircraft arrived at RAF Brize Norton in May 2012.

Shorter range, tactical-airlift transport is provided by the Lockheed Martin C-130J Hercules, known as the Hercules C4 (C-130J-30) and Hercules C5 (C-130J) in RAF service, based at RAF Brize Norton and flown by No. 47 Squadron. Twenty-five C-130Js were originally ordered in December 1994 (15 C4s and ten C5s), the first Hercules C4 to be delivered was ZH865 in August 1998, with the first Hercules C5 (ZH881) in May 1999. The 2010 SDSR called for the retirement of the Hercules fleet by 2022, with the 2015 SDSR amending this to maintaining the fourteen Hercules C4s until 2030. The draw-down of the Hercules C5 fleet began in 2016, with two left in service by December 2020. The fourteen C4 extended variants were scheduled to retire on 31 March 2035. However, due to the crash of Hercules C4 ZH873 in August 2017, one Hercules C5 was retained to keep the fleet at 14 aircraft. The 2021 Defence Command Paper brought forward the retirement of the Hercules fleet to 2023.

The Airbus Atlas C1 (A400M) replaced the RAF's fleet of Hercules C1/C3 (C-130K) which were withdrawn from use on 28 October 2013, having originally entered service in 1967. Based at RAF Brize Norton, the Atlas fleet is operated by No. 30 Squadron and No. LXX Squadron. The first Atlas C1 (ZM400) was delivered to the RAF in November 2014. The A400M is also expected to replace the C4/C5 variants. Originally, twenty-five A400Ms were ordered; the total purchase has now dropped to twenty-two.

No. XXIV Squadron acts as the Air Mobility OCU (AMOCU) for the Globemaster, Hercules and Atlas, while No. 206 Squadron is the OEU.

Air transport tasks are also carried out by the Airbus Voyager KC2/3, flown by No. 10 Squadron and No. 101 Squadron. The first Voyager (ZZ330) arrived in the UK for testing at MOD Boscombe Down in April 2011, and entered service in April 2012. The Voyager received approval from the MOD on 16 May 2013 to begin air-to-air refuelling flights and made its first operational tanker flight on 20 May 2013 as part of a training sortie with Tornado GR4s. By 21 May 2013, the Voyager fleet had carried over 50,000 passengers and carried over 3,000 tons of cargo. A total of fourteen Voyagers form the fleet, with nine allocated to sole RAF use (three KC2s and six KC3s). As the Voyagers lack a refuelling boom, the RAF has requested a memorandum of understanding (MoU) with the USAF allowing the UK access to tankers equipped with refuelling booms for its RC-135W Rivet Joint .

Helicopters
RAF helicopters support the British Army by moving troops and equipment to and around the battlefield. Helicopters are also used in a variety of other roles, including in support of RAF ground units and heavy-lift support for the Royal Marines. The support helicopters are organised into the tri-service Joint Helicopter Command (JHC), along with helicopters from the British Army and Royal Navy. No. 22 Squadron, based at RAF Benson, re-formed in May 2020 as the OEU for JHC.

The large twin-rotor Boeing Chinook is the RAF's heavy-lift support helicopter. Originally ordered in 1978, with subsequent orders in 1995, 2011, and 2018 (yet to be finalised), the Chinook is operated by No. 7 Squadron, No. 18(B) Squadron and No. 27 Squadron at RAF Odiham and No. 28 Squadron (Support Helicopter OCU) at RAF Benson. Since being first delivered in 1980, the Chinook has been involved in numerous operations: the Falklands War (1982); Operation Granby (1991); Operation Engadine (1999); Operation Barras (2000); Operation Herrick (2002–2014); Operation Telic (2003–2011); Operation Ruman (2017); and Operation Newcombe (2018–present). The 60-strong fleet of Chinooks currently has an OSD in the 2040s.

The Westland Puma HC2 is the RAF's Medium-lift support helicopter. It is operated by No. 33 Squadron and No. 230 Squadron, as well as by No. 28 Squadron (Support Helicopter OCU), all of which are based at RAF Benson. The first two Puma HC1s (XW198 and XW199), of an eventual forty-eight, were delivered in January 1971, which were supplemented by a captured Argentine Army SA 330J in 2001 and six ex-South African Air Force SA 330Ls in 2002. Twenty-four Puma HC1s underwent upgrades to HC2 standard between 2012 and 2014. The Puma HC2 OSD is currently March 2025.

Three Bell Griffin HAR2 are operated by No. 84 Squadron based at RAF Akrotiri in the Cyprus Sovereign Base Areas. They are the RAF's only dedicated search and rescue helicopter since the disbandment of the RAF Search and Rescue Force in February 2016. However, all UK military helicopter aircrew routinely train and practise the skills necessary for search and rescue, and the support helicopters based in the UK are available to the Government under Military Aid to the Civil Authorities.

The AgustaWestland AW109 Grand New of No. 32 (The Royal) Squadron based at RAF Northolt provides the VIP transport Command Support Air Transport role.

Training aircraft

The UK's military flying training has been privatised through a public-private partnership, known as the UK Military Flying Training System (UKMFTS). Training is provided by Ascent Flight Training, a consortium of Lockheed Martin and Babcock International. New aircraft were procured to reduce the training gap between the older generation Grob Tutor T1, Short Tucano T1 and Beechcraft King Air T1 aircraft, and the RAF's modern front-line aircraft, including advanced systems and glass cockpits. UKMFTS also relies far more on synthetic training to prepare aircrew for the front line, where advanced synthetic training is commonplace.

Initial training
The Grob Tutor T1 equips fifteen University Air Squadrons, which provide university students an opportunity to undertake an RAF training syllabus, which includes first solo, as well as air navigation, aerobatics and formation flying. These units are co-located with Air Experience Flights, which share the same aircraft and facilities and provide air experience flying to the Air Training Corps and Combined Cadet Force. The Tutor is also flown by No. 16 Squadron and No. 115 Squadron based at RAF Wittering.

Volunteer Gliding Squadrons also provide air experience flying to cadets using the Grob Viking T1 conventional glider. Due to an airworthiness issue in April 2014, the Viking fleet and the Grob Vigilant T1 fleet were grounded for a two-year period, although Viking operations have subsequently resumed. The Vigilant was unexpectedly withdrawn from service in May 2018, a year earlier than planned. A contract tender was initiated in February 2018 to replace this capability from 2022 onwards.

Elementary training 
The Grob Prefect T1 was introduced to RAF service in 2016 as its elementary trainer. The 23-strong fleet is based at RAF Cranwell and RAF Barkston Heath in Lincolnshire where they are operated by No. 57 Squadron. On completion of elementary training, aircrew are then streamed to either fast jet, multi-engine, or rotary training.

Basic fast jet training 
Basic fast jet training is provided on the Beechcraft Texan T1, which replaced the Short Tucano T1 in November 2019. The Texan is a tandem-seat turboprop aircraft, featuring a digital glass cockpit. It is operated by No. 72 (F) Squadron based at RAF Valley in Anglesey which provides lead-in training for RAF and Royal Navy fighter pilots prior to advanced training on the BAE Hawk T2. The first two Texans were delivered in February 2018 and by December 2018 ten aircraft had arrived at RAF Valley. Four additional Texans were delivered on 3 November 2020.

Advanced fast jet training

The BAE Hawk T2 is flown by No. IV (AC) Squadron and No. XXV (F) Squadron based at RAF Valley. The latter provides initial Advanced Fast Jet Training (AFJT), while pilots who graduate on to the former squadron learn tactical and weapons training. After advanced training aircrew go on to an Operational Conversion Unit (OCU) where they are trained to fly either the Typhoon FGR4 (No. 29 Squadron at RAF Coningsby) or F-35B Lightning (No. 207 Squadron at RAF Marham) in preparation for service with a front-line squadron. The OCUs use operational aircraft alongside simulators and ground training, although in the case of the Typhoon a two-seater training variant exists which is designated the Typhoon T3.

On 15 October 2020, it was announced a joint RAF-Qatari Air Force Hawk squadron (similar to No. 12 Squadron) would be formed in the future. On 1 April 2021, it was further elaborated that this squadron would stand-up in September 2021 at RAF Leeming, North Yorkshire. The Joint Hawk Training Squadron received its first two Hawk Mk.167s at RAF Leeming on 1 September 2021. On 24 November 2021, the Joint Hawk Training Squadron became 11 Squadron QEAF when it reformed at RAF Leeming.

Multi-engine training

Multi-Engine aircrew, weapon systems officer (WSO) and weapon systems operator (WSOp) students are trained on the Embraer Phenom T1. It is operated by No. 45 Squadron based at RAF Cranwell. Multi-engine aircrew then go to their Operational Conversion Unit or front-line squadron.

Rotary
No. 1 Flying Training School (No. 1 FTS) (formerly the Defence Helicopter Flying School) is based at RAF Shawbury in Shropshire and provides basic helicopter pilot training for all UK armed forces. It flies twenty-nine Airbus Juno HT1. No. 1 FTS comprises two main elements, 2 Maritime Air Wing (2 MAW) and No. 9 Regiment. 2 MAW includes No. 660 Squadron of the Army Air Corps (AAC) and 705 Naval Air Squadron and provide basic helicopter flying training. No. 9 Regiment comprises No. 60 Squadron of the RAF and No. 670 Squadron of the AAC in the advanced helicopter flying training. No. 202 Squadron is also part of No. 1 FTS and operates the Airbus Jupiter HT1 at RAF Valley.

Future aircraft

On 5 October 2015, it was announced that the Scavenger programme had been replaced by "Protector", a new requirement for at least 20 unmanned aerial vehicles. On 7 October 2015, it was revealed that Protector will be a certifiable derivative of the MQ-9B SkyGuardian with enhanced range and endurance. In 2016, it was indicated that at least sixteen aircraft would be purchased with a maximum of up to twenty-six. In July 2018, a General Atomics US civil-registered SkyGuardian was flown from North Dakota to RAF Fairford for the Royal International Air Tattoo where it was given RAF markings. It was formally announced by the Chief of Air Staff that No. 31 Squadron would become the first squadron to operate the Protector RG1 as it will be known in RAF service. In July 2020, the Ministry of Defence signed a contract for three Protectors with an option on an additional thirteen aircraft. The 2021 Defence Command Paper confirmed the order for 16 Protectors, despite the fact that the 2015 SDSR originally laid out plans for more than 20.

In July 2014, the House of Commons Defence Select Committee released a report on the RAF future force structure that envisaged a mixture of unmanned and manned platforms, including further F-35, Protector RG1, a service life extension for the Typhoon (which would otherwise end its service in 2030) or a possible new manned aircraft. In July 2018, at the Farnborough Airshow, the Defence Secretary announced a £2bn investment for BAE Systems, MBDA and Leonardo to develop a new British 6th Generation Fighter to replace Typhoon in 2035 under Project Tempest.

On 22 March 2019, the Defence Secretary announced the UK had signed a $1.98 billion deal to procure five Boeing E-7 Wedgetails to replace the ageing Boeing E-3D Sentry AEW1 fleet in the Airborne Early Warning and Control (AEW&C) role. As of May 2020, the first E-7 is expected to enter RAF service in 2023 with the final aircraft arriving in late 2025 or early 2026. In December 2020, it was announced that the Wedgetail AEW1 will be based at RAF Lossiemouth. The 2021 Defence Command Paper cut the Wedgetail order down to three aircraft. The Sentry AEW1s were officially withdrawn on 28 September 2021.

Symbols, flags, emblems and uniform

Following the tradition of the other British armed services, the RAF has adopted symbols to represent it, use as rallying devices for members and promote esprit de corps. British aircraft in the early stages of the First World War carried the Union Flag as an identifying feature; however, this was easily confused with Germany's Iron Cross motif. In October 1914, therefore, the French system of three concentric rings was adopted, with the colours reversed to a red disc surrounded by a white ring and an outer blue ring. The relative sizes of the rings have changed over the years and during the Second World War an outer yellow ring was added to the fuselage roundel. Aircraft serving in the Far East during the Second World War had the red disc removed to prevent confusion with Japanese aircraft. Since the 1970s, camouflaged aircraft carry low-visibility roundels, either red and blue on dark camouflage, or washed-out pink and light blue on light colours. Most non-camouflaged training and transport aircraft retain the traditional red-white-blue roundel.

The choice of motto is attributed to a junior officer named J S Yule, in response to a request for suggestions from a commander of the Royal Flying Corps, Colonel Sykes.

The badge of the Royal Air Force was first used in August 1918. In heraldic terms, it is: "In front of a circle inscribed with the motto Per Ardua ad Astra and ensigned by the Imperial Crown an eagle volant and affronté head lowered and to the sinister". Although there have been debates among airmen over the years about whether the bird was originally meant to be an albatross or an eagle, the consensus is that it was always an eagle.

Ceremonial functions and display

Red Arrows

The Red Arrows, officially known as the Royal Air Force Aerobatic Team, is the aerobatics display team of the Royal Air Force based at  RAF Waddington. The team was formed in late 1964 as an all-RAF team, replacing a number of unofficial teams that had been sponsored by RAF commands. The Red Arrows badge shows the aircraft in their trademark Diamond Nine formation, with the motto , a French word meaning "brilliance" or "excellence".

Initially, they were equipped with seven Folland Gnat trainers inherited from the RAF Yellowjacks display team. This aircraft was chosen because it was less expensive to operate than front-line fighters. In their first season, they flew at sixty-five shows across Europe. In 1966, the team was increased to nine members, enabling them to develop their Diamond Nine formation. In late 1979, they switched to the BAE Hawk trainer. The Red Arrows have performed over 4,700 displays in fifty-six countries worldwide.

Royal Air Force Music

Headquarters Royal Air Force Music Services, located at RAF Northolt, supports professional musicians who perform at events around the globe in support of the RAF. The Central Band of the Royal Air Force was established in 1920. Other bands include the Band of the Royal Air Force College, the Band of the Royal Air Force Regiment and the Band of the Royal Auxiliary Air Force.

See also

 List of all aircraft current and former of the United Kingdom 
 List of military aircraft operational during World War II
 List of Royal Air Force stations
 Royal Air Force Air Cadets
 Royal Air Force Museum
 RAF News

Footnotes

References

Bibliography
 Biddle, Tami Davis. Rhetoric and Reality in Air Warfare: The Evolution of British and American Ideas about Strategic Bombing, 1914–1945 (2002)
 Bowyer, Chaz. History of the RAF (London: Hamlyn, 1977).
 Dean, Maurice. The Royal Air Force and Two World Wars (Cassell, 1979).
 Connolly, Corvin J. Marshal of the Royal Air Force Sir John Cotesworth Slessor and the Anglo-American Air Power Alliance, 1940–1945 (Texas A&M Press, 2001).
 Cox, Jafna L. "A splendid training ground: the importance to the Royal Air Force of its role in Iraq, 1919–32." Journal of Imperial and Commonwealth History 13.2 (1985): 157–184.
 Davis, Richard B. Bombing the European Axis Powers. A Historical Digest of the Combined Bomber Offensive 1939–1945 (Air University Press,  2006) online 
 Gooderson, Ian. Air Power at the Battlefront: Allied Close Air Support in Europe 1943–45  (Routledge, 2013).
 Heaton, Colin D., and Anne-Marie Lewis. Night Fighters: Luftwaffe and RAF Air Combat Over Europe, 1939–1945 (Naval Institute Press, 2008).

 Hoffman, Bruce. British Air Power in Peripheral Conflict, 1919–1976 (RAND, 1989)   online , with bibliography 

 Lee, David. Eastward: a history of the Royal Air Force in the Far East, 1945-1972 (Seven Hills Books, 1984).
 Lee, David. Flight from the Middle East: A History of the Royal Air Force in the Arabian Peninsula and Adjacent Territories, 1945–1972 (HM Stationery Office, 1980).
 Maiolo, Joseph. Cry Havoc: How the arms race drove the world to war, 1931–1941 (2010)
 Philpott, Ian, ed. Royal Air Force History: Royal Air Force – an Encyclopaedia of the Inter-War Years (2 vol 2008)
 Rawlings, John D.R. The History of the Royal Air Force (1984) well illustrated. 
 Richards, Denis, and David Pilgrim. Royal Air Force, 1939–1945: The fight at odds (1954), the official history.
 
 Saunders, Hilary. Per Ardua: The Rise of British Air Power, 1911-1939 (Oxford UP, 1945).
 Sinnott, Colin S. The RAF and Aircraft Design: Air Staff Operational Requirements 1923-1939 (Routledge, 2014).
 Smith, Malcolm. British Air Strategy Between the Wars (Oxford, The Clarendon Press, 1984). 
 Smith, Gordon Scott. RAF War Plans and British Foreign Policy 1935 – 1940 (MIT Dept. of Political Science, 1966). online
 
 Werrell, Kenneth P. "The strategic bombing of Germany in World War II: Costs and accomplishments." Journal of American History 73.3 (1986): 702–713. online

External links 

 
 
 RAF Benevolent Fund
 The RAF channel on YouTube

 
1918 establishments in the United Kingdom
Articles containing video clips
British Armed Forces
Ministry of Defence (United Kingdom)
Military of the United Kingdom
Military units and formations established in 1918
Organisations based in the United Kingdom with royal patronage